Harold Interlocking is a large railroad junction located in New York City. It is the busiest rail junction in the United States. It serves trains on Amtrak's Northeast Corridor and the Long Island Rail Road's Main Line and Port Washington Branch, which diverge at the junction.

Reconstruction work on Harold Interlocking started in 2009, as part of the East Side Access project to bring LIRR service to a new station under Grand Central Terminal. As part of the project, two tunnels for Northeast Corridor trains to bypass Harold Interlocking were built to address congestion problems and occasional accidents.

Location and operation

The junction is located in Queens, New York, east of the East River Tunnels and next to Amtrak's and NJ Transit Rail Operations' Sunnyside Yard. During the rush hour period, over 40 trains per hour pass through the interlocking; and a total of 783 trains each weekday. In addition to Amtrak trains, the interlocking serves the Long Island Rail Road (LIRR), whose Main Line and Port Washington Branch diverge from the Northeast Corridor at Harold Interlocking.

The complexity of the junction and the large volume of traffic have caused frequent delays and occasional accidents in this portion of the Northeast Corridor.

History
The Pennsylvania Railroad built the Harold Interlocking in 1908 as part of the New York Tunnel Extension project, which built Pennsylvania Station, the North River Tunnels (under the Hudson River), the East River Tunnels and Sunnyside Yard.

The interlocking was renovated in summer 1990 during a nine-week modernization project. This renovation was conducted several months after a power surge caused trains to be stuck in the interlocking. Since the 1990s, Harold Interlocking has been controlled from a tower at Penn Station.

East Side Access improvements
The Metropolitan Transportation Authority (MTA) began construction of several infrastructure improvements to the junction area in 2009, but a major project to redesign and rebuild the interlocking required additional funding.

In May 2011, a $294.7 million federal grant was awarded to address congestion at the interlocking. The work will allow for a grade-separated route between the East River Tunnels and the Hell Gate Bridge for Amtrak trains traveling to or from New England, thus avoiding LIRR traffic. Northeast Corridor trains from the Hell Gate Bridge and New England would be able to avoid the junction entirely, while trains to the Hell Gate Bridge and New England would be able to bypass a major section of the junction. As part of the project, Amtrak's car-washing facility within Sunnyside Yard, as well as several small Amtrak buildings, are being relocated. The MTA is constructing and managing the improvement project as part of the adjacent East Side Access project to bring the LIRR to Grand Central Terminal. The MTA estimated that East Side Access will be complete in early 2023. , two of three East Side Access tunnel portals had been built at Harold Interlocking; the remaining portal had been completed by early 2021. Ultimately, East Side Access opened on January 25, 2023.

Other improvements  
Work on the Northeast Corridor bypass started in 2013. However, by October 2015, the tunnels were behind schedule because Amtrak and the MTA could not cooperate on track access schedules. These delays ultimately raised construction costs by almost $1 billion as of April 2018, and in a report that month, the MTA attributed the delays to a lack of cooperation on Amtrak's part. The work at Harold Interlocking also included the installation of a microprocessor-based interlocking logic, replacing the old relay-based one.

While some of the interlocking improvement projects are complete as of early 2023, several other projects are ongoing and will be complete by late 2025.

References

External links

 Map of Harold Interlocking - MTA
 "Inside Sunnyside Yards, New York City's Next Megaproject" – ny.curbed.com (February 19, 2015)

Amtrak
Rail junctions in the United States
Rail transportation in New York City
Long Island Rail Road
NJ Transit Rail Operations
Long Island City